Meredith J. Eberhart, widely known by his nickname Nimblewill Nomad, is an American perpetual hiker and has been the focus of various news stories.<ref
   name=moor17></ref><ref
   name=ogg09></ref><ref
   name=sheely19></ref><ref
Eberhart published a book about one of his long-distance hikes, and, as of 2021, was settled at Flagg Mountain, Alabama.

Biography
Eberhart was born in a village in the Ozarks with population of less than 400. He grew up in Russellville, near Jefferson City, Missouri. 
As a young man, Eberhart attended optometry school, got married, fathered and helped raise two boys, and made a six-figure salary working with cataract patients while living in Titusville, Florida.

After leaving his earlier life in 1998, at age 61, Eberhart became a perpetual walker. In the next 15 years he walked .
He published a book about one of his first hikes, from the Florida Keys to Quebec.

As of January 2018, under an agreement reached between the Alabama Forestry Commission and the Alabama Hiking Trail Society, Eberhart became the official caretaker at a Civilian Conservation Corps (CCC) camp atop Flagg Mountain in Weogufka, in rural Coosa County, Alabama, the southern terminus of the Pinhoti Trail. 
Press coverage in early 2019 reported that he had settled on Flagg Mountain, although it was noted that Eberhart had "announced his retirement several times in recent years before surging off on yet another odyssey."
Eberhart aspires to have the Appalachian Trail extended to Flagg Mountain, and has stated that his "purpose in life now … is to promote this remarkable geographic and historic landmark—that it might ultimately become the hub of all to do with hiking and backpacking in the South... [that] those who dream of one day hiking the Appalachians, those folks, all, will think first of Flagg Mountain."
Eberhart has made great contributions in restoring the once dilapidated CCC site.

As late as April 2022 Mr. Eberhart has stated that he in fact does not support the AT2AL movement. His official website  
https://nimblewillnomad.com states that the use of his name and likeness to promote the AT extension has been done without his permission.

Eberhart was profiled in several pages of the 2016 book On Trails by environmental journalist Robert Moor, whom he advised to call him "Eb".

Views
During his years of perpetual walking and hiking, Eberhart was quoted in The Guardian as stating: 

Regarding why he has done his long-distance walking, Eberhart said he has "managed to get the answer boiled down to just 32 words": 

Nimblewill is distressed at the homogenization of trails as they are re-routed away from human habitation, lamenting:

Book
Nimblewill published a book, using his birth name Eberhart:

References

External links
 Nimblewill Nomad (personal website) 
 Alabama Trailhikers Society (Flagg Mountain page)

Hikers
American sportsmen
Date of birth missing (living people)
Living people
Year of birth missing (living people)